Trigona collina is one of the stingless bee species with reported nesting sites in Thailand.

References

External links
Trigona (Tetragonilla) collina Smith, 1857, Hymenoptera collection of the Slovenian Museum of Natural History, Ljubljana
Development of a species-diagnostic marker and its application for population genetics studies of the stingless bee Trigona collina in Thailand
First Record of the Predator, Pahabengkakia piliceps Miller, 1941 (Reduviidae, Harpactorinae) in the Stingless Bee, Trigona collina Smith, 1857 (Apidae, Meliponinae) in Thailand

Insects of Thailand
Insects described in 1857
collina